Leverkusen-Rheindorf station is located in the district of Rheindorf in the city of Leverkusen in the German state of North Rhine-Westphalia. It is on the Cologne–Duisburg line and is classified by Deutsche Bahn as a category 5 station.  It is served by Rhine-Ruhr S-Bahn line S 6 every 20 minutes.

Services 

Currently, the station is served by S-Bahn line S6 and three regular bus routes: 207, 211 and 215 (operated by Wupsi GmbH).

Notes

Railway stations in Germany opened in 1991
Rhine-Ruhr S-Bahn stations
S6 (Rhine-Ruhr S-Bahn)
Buildings and structures in Leverkusen